This is the list of the members of the Parliament of Finland between April 1, 1919 – September 4, 1922 following the parliamentary election in 1919. In the elections Social Democratic Party of Finland won 80 seats, Agrarian Party (Maalaisliitto, Agrarian League) 42, National Coalition Party (Kansallinen Kokoomus) 28, National Progressive Party (Kansallinen Edistyspuolue) 26, Swedish People's Party (Ruotsalainen kansanpuolue) 22 and Christian Workers' Union (Suomen kristillisen työväen liitto) 2.

Lauri Kristian Relander was selected as Speaker of the Parliament of Finland on April 2. He resigned after being appointed the governor of Viipuri Province on May 8, 1920. Kyösti Kallio was then the Speaker until March 29, 1921, when he was replaced by Wäinö Wuolijoki.

Five cabinets were formed during this parliament: 4 composed of parties from right and center, and one caretaker cabinet. Only the cabinet of Erich had the majority in the parliament.

Members of the Parliament 1919–1922
In the table, the names written with italics were appointed to the Parliament later than April 1, 1919—the first day of the new Parliament—to replace those who had died or resigned.

Notes

References

 

1919
Parliament
Parliament